Kedar Nath Kashyap (born 5 November 1974) is an Indian politician and a member of Bharatiya Janata Party. He served as Cabinet Minister in Government of Chhattisgarh holding School Education, Tribal and Scheduled Caste, Backward Class and Minority Development portfolios.

He is son of senior BJP Leader Late Baliram Kashyap and younger brother of former MP Dinesh Kashyap.

Political career
Kashyap was first elected as MLA in 2003 from Bhanpuri constituency and became Minister of State (Independent Charge) in Raman Singh's ministry. He got re-elected in 2008 from Narayanpur and also retained the seat in 2013 Assembly election. He served as Cabinet Minister for Tribal and Scheduled Caste, Backward Class and Minority Development during 2008 to 2018. He lost 2018 Assembly election to Chandan Kashyap of Congress.

References 

Living people
Chhattisgarh MLAs 2013–2018
Chhattisgarh MLAs 2008–2013
Chhattisgarh MLAs 2003–2008
Bharatiya Janata Party politicians from Chhattisgarh
1974 births